Archibald Angus Charles Kennedy, 8th Marquess of Ailsa, 19th Earl of Cassilis, 21st Lord Kennedy, 8th Baron Ailsa, (13 September 1956 – 15 January 2015), was a Scottish peer.

Early life

Archibald Angus Charles Kennedy was born on 13 September 1956 in Culzean Castle, Ayrshire. He was the eldest of two sons born to Mary (née Burn) and Archibald Kennedy, 7th Marquess of Ailsa. Kennedy was raised in Cassillis House, another family seat, and was educated at Strathallan School, he studied forestry and farming.

His maternal grandfather was John Burn of Amble, Northumberland and his paternal grandparents were Angus Kennedy, 6th Marquess of Ailsa and Gertrude Millicent (née Cooper) Kennedy, daughter of Gervas Weir Cooper, of Wordwell Hall, Suffolk.

Peerage
The Marquess of Ailsa is the hereditary Clan Chief of Clan Kennedy. All of the Marquesses are descendants of Anne Watts, mother of Archibald Kennedy, 1st Marquess of Ailsa and descendant of the Schuyler family, the Van Cortlandt family (including Stephanus Van Cortlandt), and the Delancey family of British North America. The title is derived from the island of Ailsa Craig in the Firth of Clyde, which is owned by the family. In 2011, the Marquess put up the island for sale. As of March 2013, the asking price was offers over £1,500,000.

Kennedy succeeded to the titles of 19th Earl of Cassilis, 21st Lord Kennedy, 8th Marquess of Ailsa & 8th Baron Ailsa on 7 April 1994 after the death of his father. Upon his death, he was succeeded by his brother, David Kennedy, 9th Marquess of Ailsa (b. 1958). The 9th Marquess' heir apparent is his son Archibald David Kennedy (born 1995).

Career
Kennedy gained a commission in the Queen's Own Highlanders. He later taught skiing and mountain craft to teams of army youth in the Scottish Highlands and the Brecon Beacons in Wales before retiring from the military in the Ayrshire Yeomanry.

After working in sales, marketing and agriculture, he founded Lord Charles Tours which organised trips to Scotland, Ireland, Sweden and Lapland.

Personal life
In 1979, Lord Ailsa married Dawn Leslie Anne Keen, the only daughter of David A. Keen, of Rue Émeriau in Paris, France. Before their 1989 divorce, during which "his wife was accused of an affair with a teenage milk boy," they had two children:

 Lady Rosemary Margaret Kennedy (b. 1980)
 Lady Alicia-Jane Lesley Kennedy (b. 1981)

The 8th Marquess died on 15 January 2015, while visiting a Kennedy clan function in Altamonte Springs, Florida.

Ancestry

References

External links

Archibald Kennedy, 8th Marquess of Ailsa

1956 births
2015 deaths
Conservative Party (UK) hereditary peers
Archibald
People educated at Strathallan School
Scottish clan chiefs
Scottish landowners
Scottish people of Dutch descent
Schuyler family
Van Cortlandt family
8
20th-century Scottish landowners
20th-century Scottish businesspeople
Ailsa